The 1992 Green Bay Packers season was their 74th season overall and their 72nd in the National Football League. The team finished with a 9–7 record under new coach Mike Holmgren, earning them a second-place finish in the NFC Central division. 1992 saw the emergence of QB Brett Favre and the start of the Packers' success of the 1990s.

Offseason

NFL draft

Staff

Roster

Regular season

Schedule

Note: Intra-division opponents are in bold text.

Season summary

Brett Favre
In the second game of the 1992 season, the Packers played the Tampa Bay Buccaneers. The Buccaneers were leading 17–0 at half time when head coach Mike Holmgren benched starting quarterback Don Majkowski and Favre played the second half. On his first regular season play as a Packer, Favre threw a pass which was deflected and caught by himself. Favre was tackled and the completion went for −7 yards. The Packers lost the game 31–3, chalking up only 106 yards passing.

In the third game of the 1992 season, then-starting quarterback Don Majkowski injured a ligament in his ankle against the Cincinnati Bengals, an injury severe enough that he would be out for four weeks. Favre replaced Majkowski for the remainder of the contest. Favre fumbled four times during the course of the game, a performance poor enough that the crowd chanted for Favre to be removed in favor of another Packers backup quarterback at the time, Ty Detmer. However, down 23–17 with 1:07 left in the game, the Packers started an offensive series on their own 8 yard line. Still at the quarterback position, Favre completed a 42 yard pass to Sterling Sharpe. Two plays later, Favre threw the game-winning touchdown pass to Kitrick Taylor with 13 seconds remaining.

The next week's game against the Pittsburgh Steelers began the longest consecutive starts streak for a quarterback in NFL history. The game ended in a 17–3 victory and his passer rating was 144.6. During the season, Favre helped put together a six-game winning streak for the Packers, the longest winning streak for the club since 1965. They ended 9–7 that season, missing the playoffs on their last game. Favre finished his first season as a Packer with 3,227 yards and a quarterback rating of 85.3, helping him to his first Pro Bowl.

Week 1

Week 2

Week 3 vs Bengals

Week 4

Week 5

Week 7

Week 8

Week 9

Week 10

Week 11

Week 12

Week 13

Week 14

Week 15

Week 16

Week 17

Standings

Awards and records
 Brett Favre, NFC Pro Bowl
 Brett Favre, NFC Leader, Completions (tied): 302

References

 Sportsencyclopedia.com

Green Bay Packers seasons
Green Bay Packers
Green